María Teresa Martín-Vivaldi García-Trevijano (born 1955) is a Spanish painter.

Artistic career
María Teresa Martín-Vivaldi was born in Granada and earned her licentiate in political science and sociology, specializing in social anthropology, from the Complutense University of Madrid.

Her work is characterized by the abundant use of color and suggestion. In 1978 she began to exhibit, and has participated in 40 solo and 56 collective exhibitions. Her work can be found in public and private collections such as the Museum of Hispanic Art in Miami and the Museo Picasso Málaga. She has exhibited at the Santiago Collado Art Space in Granada, at the Madrasah of Granada, at the Petleys gallery in London, at the Provinciaal Museum voor Moderne Kunst, and at the Caesarea Gallery in Florida.

In 1993 she won the Tesorillo fine arts prize. In 1995 she received the BMW Prize's medal of honor, for which she was also a finalist the following year. In 1999 she took second place in the Emilio Ollero painting competition. In 2000 she won the Jury Prize at the Galerie Artitude in Paris.

She also works in serigraphs and lithographs, and makes covers and illustrations.

References

External links
 
 Jardín de Secano at the University of Granada

1955 births
20th-century lithographers
20th-century Spanish painters
21st-century lithographers
21st-century Spanish painters
Painters from Andalusia
Complutense University of Madrid alumni
Living people
People from Granada
Spanish women painters
Women lithographers
20th-century Spanish women